The following is a list of films produced by Paramount Pictures and released (or scheduled to be released) in the 2020s.

All films listed are theatrical releases unless specified.
A ‡ signifies a streaming release exclusively through Paramount+.
A § signifies a simultaneous release to theaters and on Paramount+.
A * signifies a streaming release through a third-party streaming service.

Released

Upcoming

Undated films

References

External links 
 Paramount Pictures Complete Library

 2020-2029
American films by studio
2020s in American cinema
Lists of 2020s films